The nickname "Diamond Joe" or "Diamond Jo" may refer to:

People
Joseph "Diamond Jo" Reynolds (1819–1891)
Joe Esposito (mobster) (1872–1928)

Places
Diamond Jo Boat Store and Office, a historic building located in Dubuque, Iowa
Diamond Jo Casino, a casino and entertainment complex in Dubuque, Iowa
Diamond Jo Casino – Worth, a casino and entertainment complex in Worth County, Iowa

Characters
Joe Biden (The Onion), a fictionalized caricature of American politician Joe Biden
"Diamond Joe" Quimby, a character from The Simpsons

See also
Diamond (disambiguation)
Diamond (given name)
Diamond (surname)
Joe (disambiguation)